Mar Virado Island or Ilha do Mar Virado is an island of Brazil. It is located to the west of Anchieta Island in the state of São Paulo, in the southeastern part of the country, 900 km south of Brasília.

See also
Dorath Pinto Uchôa

References

Atlantic islands of Brazil
Archipelagoes of the Atlantic Ocean
Landforms of São Paulo (state)